Mihai Țurcan may refer to:

 Mihai Țurcan (footballer, born 1989), Moldovan footballer
 Mihai Țurcan (footballer, born 1941), Romanian footballer